Paragiai Manor is a former wooden residential manor in Paragiai village, Akmenė District Municipality, Šiauliai County, Lithuania.

References

Manor houses in Lithuania
Buildings and structures in Šiauliai County
Akmenė District Municipality